Nowa Ruda may refer to the following places:
Nowa Ruda, Lower Silesian Voivodeship (south-west Poland)
Nowa Ruda, Lublin Voivodeship (east Poland)
Nowa Ruda, Podlaskie Voivodeship (north-east Poland)
Nowa Ruda, Greater Poland Voivodeship (west-central Poland)